Sarah Vaughan Sings George Gershwin is a 1958 studio album by Sarah Vaughan, of the music of George Gershwin.

Vaughan would release another all-Gershwin album, Gershwin Live!, in 1982.

Track listing
 "Isn't It a Pity?" – 3:53
 "Of Thee I Sing" – 3:10
 "I'll Build a Stairway to Paradise" (Buddy De Sylva, George Gershwin, Ira Gershwin) – 2:39
 "Someone to Watch over Me" – 3:58
 "Bidin' My Time" – 3:01
 "The Man I Love" – 3:34
 "How Long Has This Been Going On?"  – 3:58
 "My One and Only (What Am I Gonna Do?)" – 3:13
 "Lorelei" – 2:32
 "I've Got a Crush on You" – 4:00
 "Summertime" (G. Gershwin, I. Gershwin, DuBose Heyward) – 2:51
 "Aren't You Kinda Glad We Did?" – 3:27
 "They All Laughed" – 2:23
 "Looking For a Boy" – 3:38
 "He Loves and She Loves" – 3:24
 "My Man's Gone Now" (G. Gershwin, I. Gershwin, Heyward) – 4:22
 "I Won't Say I Will" (DeSylva, G. Gershwin, I. Gershwin) – 3:24
 "A Foggy Day" – 3:24
 "Let's Call the Whole Thing Off"  – 2:22
 "Things Are Looking Up" – 3:33
 "Do It Again" (DeSylva, I. Gershwin) – 3:13
 "Love Walked In" – 3:06
 1999 Cd reissue bonus tracks not included on the original 1958 release:
 "Of Thee I Sing"  – 3:23
 "Summertime" 	
 "Things Are Looking Up"  – 3:21
 "I Won't Say I Will" (Buddy DeSylva, G. Gershwin, I. Gershwin) – 0:18
 "I Won't Say I Will" – 3:21
 "I Won't Say I Will" – 1:21
 "I Won't Say I Will"  – 2:50
 "I Won't Say I Will"  – 7:49
 "Of Thee I Sing"  – 1:35
 "Of Thee I Sing" – 2:25
 "Of Thee I Sing" – 2:16
 "Of Thee I Sing" – 4:02
 "My One and Only (What Am I Gonna Do?)" – 1:47
 "My One and Only (What Am I Gonna Do?)" – 3:11
 "My One and Only (What Am I Gonna Do?)" – 4:34

All songs composed by George Gershwin with lyrics by Ira Gershwin, unless otherwise indicated.

Personnel 
 Sarah Vaughan – vocals
 Hal Mooney – arranger

References

1958 albums
Sarah Vaughan albums
Albums arranged by Hal Mooney
EmArcy Records albums
Albums produced by Bob Shad